Sport Today is a sports news programme produced by the BBC and is shown on BBC World News. It is broadcast up to 12 times daily from Monday-Thursday, 11 times daily on Friday and twice daily at the weekend. The programme provides the news, results and action from major sports events around the world.

In the United Kingdom, it is broadcast as Sportsday, weekdays at 13:30, 18:30, 22:30 weekends at 13:15, 18:30 and 19:30, following the main news bulletins on BBC One.

From 13 June 2011, three more bulletins were added to provide more news content for viewers in the UK overnight and in the Asia-Pacific region in the mornings. They are shown as part of the BBC's Newsday, these are simulcast on BBC News Channel, BBC World News & BBC One.

Presenters
BBC Television Centre, London (2003–2012)
 Rob Bonnet
 Francis Collings
 Adnan Nawaz
 David Brenner

MediaCityUK, Salford (2012–present)
 Mike Bushell
 Marc Edwards
 James Pearce
 Karthi Gnanasegaram
 Ore Oduba
 Reshmin Chowdhury
 Phil Jones
 Damian Johnson
 Jonathan Legard
 Sue Thearle (freelance)
 Lizzie Greenwood-Hughes
 Tulsen Tollett
 Laura McGhie
 Holly Hamilton

BBC television news shows
BBC World News shows